Dumitru "Mitică" Marcu (born 9 April 1950) is a Romanian former professional football forward and manager. Despite Marcu started his career at Steaua București, he remained as a legendary player of the first golden generation of Universitatea Craiova, nicknamed "The Champion of a Great Love", together with players such as: Ion Oblemenco, Petre Deselnicu, Alexandru Boc or Theodor Țarălungă, among others. Marcu scored 63 goals in 203 matches for the white and blues.

After retirement, Marcu started his career as a manager, managing Jiul Petroșani, several times and FC U Craiova. Between 2012 and 2016, Marcu was the sporting director of FC Gloria Buzău.

International career
Dumitru Marcu played in 16 matches for Romania and scored 3 goals.

Honours

Player
Universitatea Craiova
 Divizia A: 1973–74, 1979–80
 Cupa României: 1977–78, 1978–79

References

External links
 
 

1950 births
Living people
People from Olt County
Romanian footballers
Association football forwards
Romania international footballers
Liga I players
Liga II players
FC Steaua București players
CS Universitatea Craiova players
FC Gloria Buzău players
Romanian football managers
CSM Jiul Petroșani managers
Al-Wehda Club (Mecca) managers
FC U Craiova 1948 managers
Saudi Professional League managers
Romanian expatriate sportspeople in Saudi Arabia
Expatriate football managers in Saudi Arabia